The Mackay Rugby Union is the local rugby union competition in Australia's Mackay and Whitsunday regions.

History 
Rugby Union in Mackay can be traced to as early as 1901.

Current clubs 
The clubs contesting the 2022 season are;
 Bowen
 Brothers
 Kuttabul
 Moranbah
 Mackay City
 Proserpine Whitsunday Raiders
 Slade Point

Reference 

1901 establishments in Australia
Sports organizations established in 1901
Rugby union competitions in Queensland
Rugby union governing bodies in Queensland
Mackay, Queensland
Whitsunday Region